Journey to the Center of the Earth, also translated with the variant titles A Journey to the Centre of the Earth and A Journey into the Interior of the Earth, is a classic science fiction novel by Jules Verne. It was first published in French in 1864, then reissued in 1867 in a revised and expanded edition.  Professor Otto Lidenbrock is the tale's central figure, an eccentric German scientist who believes there are volcanic tubes that reach to the very center of the earth. He, his nephew Axel, and their Icelandic guide Hans rappel into Iceland's celebrated inactive volcano Snæfellsjökull, then contend with many dangers, including cave-ins, subpolar tornadoes, an underground ocean, and living prehistoric creatures from the Mesozoic and Cenozoic eras (the 1867 revised edition inserted additional prehistoric material in Chaps. 37–39). Eventually the three explorers are spewed back to the surface by an active volcano, Stromboli, located in southern Italy.

The category of subterranean fiction existed well before Verne. However his novel's distinction lay in its well-researched Victorian science and its inventive contribution to the science-fiction subgenre of time travel—Verne's innovation was the concept of a prehistoric realm still existing in the present-day world. Journey inspired many later authors, including Sir Arthur Conan Doyle in his novel The Lost World, Edgar Rice Burroughs in his Pellucidar series, and J. R. R. Tolkien in The Hobbit.

Plot 
The story begins in May 1863, at the home of Professor Otto Lidenbrock in Hamburg, Germany. While leafing through an original runic manuscript of an Icelandic saga, Lidenbrock and his nephew Axel find a coded note written in runic script along with the name of a 16th-century Icelandic alchemist, Arne Saknussemm. When translated into English, the note reads:

Lidenbrock departs for Iceland immediately, taking the reluctant Axel with him. After a swift trip via Kiel and Copenhagen, they arrive in Reykjavík. There they hire as their guide Icelander Hans Bjelke, a Danish-speaking eiderduck hunter, then travel overland to the base of Snæfellsjökull.

In late June they reach the volcano and set off into the bowels of the earth, encountering many dangers and strange phenomena. After taking a wrong turn, they run short of water and Axel nearly perishes, but Hans saves them all by tapping into a subterranean river, which shoots out a stream of water that Lidenbrock and Axel name the "Hansbach" in the guide's honor.
Following the course of the Hansbach, the explorers descend many miles and reach an underground world, with an ocean and a vast ceiling with clouds, as well as a permanent Aurora giving light. The travelers build a raft out of semipetrified wood and set sail. While at sea, they encounter prehistoric fish such as pterichthyodes (here called "pterichthys") and giant marine reptiles from the age of dinosaurs, namely an ichthyosaurus and a plesiosaurus. A lightning storm threatens to destroy the raft and its passengers, but instead throws them onto the site of an enormous fossil graveyard, including bones from the pterodactylus, Megatherium, and mastodon, and the preserved body of a man. 

Lidenbrock and Axel venture into a forest featuring primitive vegetation from the Tertiary Period; in its depths they are stunned to find a prehistoric humanoid more than twelve feet in height and watching over a herd of mastodons. Fearing it may be hostile, they leave the forest.

Continuing to explore the coastline, the travellers find a passageway marked by Saknussemm as the way ahead, but it has been blocked by a recent cave-in. The adventurers lay plans to blow the rock open with gun cotton, meanwhile paddling their raft out to sea to avoid the blast. On executing this scheme, they open a bottomless pit beyond the impeding rock and are swept into it as the sea rushes down the huge open gap. After spending hours descending at breakneck speed, their raft reverses direction and rises inside a volcanic chimney that ultimately spews them into the open air. When they regain consciousness, they learn that they have been ejected from Stromboli, a volcanic island located off Sicily.

The trio returns to Germany, where they enjoy great acclaim; Professor Lidenbrock is hailed as one of the great scientists of the day, Axel marries his sweetheart Gräuben, and Hans returns to his peaceful, eiderduck-hunting life in Iceland.

Main characters 
 Professor Otto Lidenbrock: a hot-tempered geologist with radical ideas.
 Axel: Lidenbrock's nephew, a young student whose ideas are more cautious.
 Hans Bjelke: Icelandic eiderduck hunter who hires on as their guide; resourceful and imperturbable.
 Gräuben: Lidenbrock's goddaughter, with whom Axel is in love; from Vierlande (region southeast of Hamburg).
 Martha: Lidenbrock's housekeeper and cook.

Publication notes 
The original French editions of 1864 and 1868 were issued by J. Hetzel et Cie, a major Paris publishing house owned by Pierre-Jules Hetzel.

The novel's first English edition, translated by an unknown hand and published in 1871 by the London house Griffith & Farran, appeared under the title A Journey to the Centre of the Earth and is now available at Project Gutenberg. A drastically rewritten version of the story, it adds chapter titles where Verne gives none, meanwhile changing the professor's surname to Hardwigg, Axel's name to Harry, and Gräuben's to Gretchen. In addition, many paragraphs and details are completely recomposed, and its text as a whole has been excoriated by scholars as one of the poorest extant Verne translations.

An 1877 London edition from Ward, Lock, & Co. appeared under the title A Journey into the Interior of the Earth. Its translation, credited to Frederick Amadeus Malleson, is more faithful than the Griffith & Farran rewrite, though it, too, concocts chapter titles and modifies details. Its text is likewise available at Project Gutenberg.

Adaptations

Film 
1959: Journey to the Center of the Earth, USA, directed by Henry Levin, starring James Mason and Pat Boone, distributed by 20th Century Fox. The film transfers Verne's beginning locale from Hamburg to Edinburgh, "Professor Otto Lidenbrock" becomes "Professor Oliver Lindenbrook", and Axel becomes earth-sciences student Alec McEwan. Special effects are sometimes perfunctory, modern lizards being used to portray Verne's prehistoric creatures — Rhinoceros iguanas, for instance, are decked out in paste-on dorsal fins to represent dimetrodons. The film also introduces a new subplot and two additional main characters: a female explorer (Arlene Dahl) and a villainous antagonist (Thayer David). 
It was distributed in both the U.S. in theaters as Where Time Began and the U.K. on TV as The Fabulous Journey to the Centre of the Earth.
The surname of Kathy Ireland's character in Alien from L.A. (1988), a film about a girl who falls through the Earth and discovers a repressive subterranean society, is Saknussemm.
1989: Journey to the Center of the Earth took only the title and general concept from the Verne novel, offering a new storyline aimed at a teen audience. It was written by Debra Ricci, Regina Davis, Kitty Chalmers, and Rusty Lemorande, and was directed by Lemorande and Albert Pyun. It stars Emo Philips, Paul Carafotes, Jaclyn Bernstein, Kathy Ireland, Janet Du Plessis, Nicola Cowper, Lochner De Kock, and Ilan Mitchell-Smith. 
2008: Journey to the Center of the Earth is a 3-D film by Eric Brevig. Cast members include Brendan Fraser, Anita Briem and Josh Hutcherson. The film is a modern-day paraphrase of the 1860s original — it uses Verne's book as its inciting incident instead of Saknussemm's message, then follows the novel's overall structure with fidelity: a geology professor, his nephew, and an Icelandic guide (now a female named "Hannah") penetrate Snaefells, discover a seashore with giant mushrooms, sail across an underground ocean inhabited by pods of plesiosaurus, and reach the other side where they encounter a terrestrial animal from prehistory, in this case a Tyrannosaurus, a predatory theropod dinosaur rather than a mastodon. Ultimately the three explorers exit the underworld via an erupting volcano, find themselves in present-day Italy, and return to their starting point in academia.
2008: Journey to the Center of the Earth was a direct-to-DVD release by The Asylum, also released as Journey to Middle Earth in the United Kingdom. Starring Greg Evigan as Joseph Harnet and Dedee Pfeiffer as Emily Radford, it's a low-budget adaptation, which, as with most Asylum films, was apparently released to draft off of the Eric Brevig film.

Television 
An animated television series, Journey to the Center of the Earth, first broadcast in 1967 on ABC, starring the voices of Ted Knight, Pat Harrington, Jr., and Jane Webb; loosely based on Verne's novel and closer to the 1959 film.
The first part of the second series of Around the World with Willy Fog entitled Willy Fog 2 by Spanish studio BRB Internacional was titled "Journey to the Centre of the Earth".
A limited animation television special in the Famous Classic Tales series was aired by CBS in 1977.
In 1993, NBC aired a made-for-TV film version with a cast including John Neville, F. Murray Abraham and Kim Miyori. The film used the title and general premise of Verne's novel, but had its heroes carry out the journey in an earth-penetrating machine borrowed from Burroughs. 
The Wishbone 1996 episode "Hot Diggety Dawg" followed the novel and featured several major scenes identifying the central character as Professor Lidenbrock.
The 37th episode of The Triplets, called Journey to the Center of the Earth, makes reference to this novel.
The 1999 Hallmark Entertainment miniseries starred Treat Williams, Jeremy London, Bryan Brown, Tushka Bergen, and Hugh Keays-Byrne. This version deviates massively from Verne's original.
The 2001 animated television series Ultimate Book of Spells references the novel, as the main protagonists are sent on adventures through the centre of the earth with the titular object. It was originally planned to be named after the book in general, but was changed.
 Journey to the Center of the Earth was a 2008 American-Canadian TV film from RHI Entertainment. Starring Rick Schroder, Peter Fonda, Victoria Pratt, Steven Grayhm, and Mike Dopud, it was shot in and around Vancouver during the summer of 2007. 
The 2012 episode Journey to the Center of the Earth, from Ben & Holly's Little Kingdom, makes reference to the novel. In it, the naughty twins Daisy and Poppy magically send Mrs. Fotheringill to the center of the earth, and it's up to Grandpapa Thistle to guide Ben, Holly and their family there on a rescue mission.
 Slim film+television and Federation Entertainment will produce an upcoming television series adaptation, developed by Ashley Pharoah.

Radio 
 A seven-part radio serial was broadcast on the BBC Home Service in 1962. It was produced by Claire Chovil, and starred Trevor Martin and Nigel Anthony.
 An eight-part radio serial was produced for BBC Radio 4 by Howard Jones in 1963. It starred Bernard Horsfall and Jeffrey Banks.
 A radio drama adaptation was broadcast by National Public Radio in 2000 for its series Radio Tales.
 A 90-minute radio adaptation by Stephen Walker directed by Owen O'Callan was first broadcast on BBC Radio 4 on 28 December 1995, and rebroadcast on BBC Radio 4 Extra on 20 November 2011, on 11 and 12 November 2012, and on 20 and 21 December 2014. Nicholas Le Prevost stars as Professor Otto Lidenbrock, Nathaniel Parker as Axel, and Oliver Senton as Hans. Kristen Millwood plays Rosemary McNab, a new character who funds and accompanies the expedition.
 A two-part BBC Radio 4 adaptation of Journey to the Centre of the Earth broadcast on 19 and 26 March 2017. Featuring Stephen Critchlow as Professor Lidenbrock,  Joel MacCormack as Axel, and Gudmundur Ingi Thorvaldsson as Hans, it was directed and produced by Tracey Neale and adapted by Moya O'Shea.

Theme park (themed areas) and rides 
A high speed dark ride attraction themed after the novel, Journey to the Center of the Earth, operates at the Tokyo DisneySea theme park in Urayasu, Chiba, Japan. It is located in the Verne-inspired Mysterious Island area of the park which also includes a dark ride based on Twenty Thousand Leagues Under the Sea.
Le Visionarium (Timekeeper), featuring Jules Verne in a circle vision ride (1992–2005) and Space Mountain, de la Terre à la Lune, in its original version (1995–2005), based directly on From the Earth to the Moon in Discoveryland (the hub facing part of the Land features steampunk-related theming) at Euro Disneyland (now Disneyland Paris) between 1992 and 2005

Other 
Video games called Journey to the Center of the Earth: in 1984 by Ozisoft for the Commodore 64; in 1989 by Topo Soft for the ZX Spectrum and in 2003 by Frogwares.
A Journey to the Center of the Earth game for Sega Genesis was planned but never released.
A board game adaptation of the book designed by Rüdiger Dorn was released by Kosmos in 2008.
Caedmon Records released an abridged recording of Journey to the Center of the Earth read by James Mason, in the 1960s.
Tom Baker was the reader for a recording released by Argo Records in 1977.
Jon Pertwee was the reader for a recording released by Pinnacle Records Storyteller in 1975. 
In 2011, Audible released an unabridged "Signature Performance" reading of the book by Tim Curry.
A concept album called Journey to the Centre of the Earth by Rick Wakeman was released in 1974. It combines song, narration and instrumental pieces to retell the story.
Wakeman released a second concept album called Return to the Centre of the Earth in 1999. It tells the story of a later set of travelers attempting to repeat the original journey.
 Alien Voices, an audio theater group led by Leonard Nimoy and John de Lancie, released a dramatized version of Journey to the Center of the Earth through Simon and Schuster Audio in 1997.
Christopher Lloyd's character of Doctor Emmett Brown, one of the two main fictional characters of the Back to the Future film series, makes numerous references to the works of Jules Verne in general, and Journey to the Center of the Earth in particular.
The 1992 adventure/role-playing game Quest for Glory III by Sierra Entertainment used Arne Saknoosen the Aardvark as a bit character for exploration information, alluding to the explorer Arne Saknussemm.
The DC Comics comic book series Warlord takes place in Skartaris, a land supposed to exist within a hollow earth. Its creator, Mike Grell, has confirmed that "the name comes from the mountain peak Scartaris that points the way to the passage to the Earth's core in Journey to the Center of the Earth."
Halldór Laxness, the only Icelandic author to be awarded the Nobel Prize, set his novel Under the Glacier in the area of Snæfellsjökull. The glacier has a mystic quality in the story and there are several references to A Journey to the Center of the Earth in connection with it.
 Norihiko Kurazono's Chitei Ryokou (地底旅行) is a manga adaptation of Journey to the Center of the Earth that was serialized in Comic Beam from 2015 to 2017.

See also 
 Subterranean fiction
 Pellucidar
 Spartakus and the Sun Beneath the Sea

Notes

References

Further reading 
 .

External links 
 
 Journey into the Interior of the Earth (Malleson translation; Ward, Lock & Co., 1877) from JV.Gilead.org.il
  (Malleson; Ward, Lock)
  (Griffith and Farran, 1871) – "not a translation at all but a complete re-write of the novel"
  (original French text, 1864)
 
 Journey to the Center of the Earth free audio book at TheDramaPod.com
 1963 BBC Radio serial of Journey to the Center of the Earth (audio) at Internet Archive (archive.org)
 1995 BBC Radio adaptation of Journey to the Center of the Earth (audio) at Archive.org
 2017 BBC Radio Classic Serial: "Journey to the Center of the Earth" (audio) at Archive.org

 
1864 French novels
Novels set in the 1860s
Novels by Jules Verne
1864 science fiction novels
French science fiction novels
Lost world novels
Novels about dinosaurs
Novels set in Iceland
Hollow Earth in fiction
Novels set in subterranea
French novels adapted into films
Novels set in Hamburg
Novels set in Sicily
French novels adapted into plays
Novels adapted into comics
Novels adapted into radio programs
French novels adapted into television shows
Novels adapted into video games
Fiction set in 1863
Cryptography in fiction
Travel to the Earth's center
Science fiction novels adapted into films